Paul "Biff" Rose (born October 15, 1937) is an American comedian and singer-songwriter.

Biography
Born in New Orleans, Rose moved to Hollywood where he found a job working as a comedy sketch writer with George Carlin working sometimes on the Mort Sahl show. Eventually, Rose moved to songwriting.

Following the release of 1968's The Thorn in Mrs. Rose's Side, Rose made several appearances on Johnny Carson's The Tonight Show from 1968 to 1970. Rose performed on The Smothers Brothers Comedy Hour, American Bandstand, and Hugh Hefner's Playboy After Dark. He emceed the Atlantic City Pop Festival of 1969 and the Atlanta Pop Festival of 1970.

Music
Rose recorded his first two records for Tetragrammaton Records. Following the release of 1968's The Thorn in Mrs. Rose's Side, which contained his hit single "Buzz the Fuzz". 

The song "Fill Your Heart" is Rose's best-known composition. Co-written with Paul Williams, the song was adopted by Tiny Tim as the B-side of his 1968 hit single "Tiptoe through the Tulips" before Rose's own release. Most famously, it was recorded by David Bowie on his album Hunky Dory (1971). Rick Wakeman worked as a session musician on that album and commented that Rose's version had "obviously influenced David" in the recording.

Racism 

In October 2017, Indy Week pointed out that Rose's website contained "blatantly racist and anti-semitic material". Rose has since taken down one website but operates several others along with several social media accounts where he continues to express himself with racist and anti-semitic language and ideas. He continues to make drawings on his social media pages that utilize  visual ethnic stereotypes, like Stereotypes of African Americans and Jewish nose along with graphic depictions of homophobia and misogyny.

Full-length releases
The Thorn in Mrs. Rose's Side (1968, Tetragrammaton, re-released on Buddha)
Children of Light (1969, Tetragrammaton, re-released on Buddha)
Biff Rose [some copies titled Ride On] (1970, Buddha)
Half Live at the Bitter End (1971, Buddah)
Uncle Jesus, Aunty Christ (1972, United Artists)
Roast Beef (1978, Pacific Arts)
Thee Messiah Album/Live at Gatsby's (1979, Pacific Arts)

References

Further reading
 Stevenson, Salli. "An Outasight Rap with Biff Rose; Far Out! (or 'Marching Through Georgia')". UCLA Daily Bruin. February 4, 1970.
 Dawson, Jim. "Biff Rose back at the piano after some burned-out years". The Baltimore Sun. May 29, 1978.

External links
http://www.biffrose.com

1937 births
American male singers
Songwriters from Louisiana
American comedy musicians
Living people
Musicians from New Orleans
American male songwriters